Paide linnastaadion is a multi-use stadium in Paide, Estonia.

It is currently used mostly for football matches and is the home ground of Meistriliiga team Paide Linnameeskond. 
The stadium has a seating capacity of 500.

References

External links
Paide linnastaadion at Paide Spordikeskus

Paide
Sport in Paide
Football venues in Estonia
Buildings and structures in Järva County
Multi-purpose stadiums in Estonia
Athletics (track and field) venues in Estonia